Battle of the Bands is a contest in which two or more bands compete for the title of "best band".

Battle of the Bands may also refer to:

Battle of the Bands (film), a film from the series The Naked Brothers Band
Battle of the Bands (video game), a video game for the Wii console
Battle of the Bands (book), a book set in the same universe as the High School Musical series
"Battle of the Bands" (Amphibia), an episode of Amphibia
"Battle of the Bands", an episode of Even Stevens
"Battle of the Bands", an episode of Kappa Mikey
"Battle of the Bands", an episode of The Grim Adventures of Billy & Mandy
 Honda Battle of the Bands, an annual event in the U.S. featuring marching bands from historically black colleges and universities
Pepsi Battle of the Bands, a Pakistani music television series
 The Battle of Britpop, the rivalry between Oasis and Blur and especially the chart race between "Roll with It" and "Country House"
 "The Battle of the Bands".  Miller, Jim (January 4, 1969). Rolling Stone. San Francisco: Straight Arrow Publishers, Inc. footnote 2 to The Turtles Present the Battle of the Bands